New Jersey switched to a conventional district system for the Second Congress.

See also 
 United States House of Representatives elections, 1790 and 1791
 List of United States representatives from New Jersey

References 

New Jersey
1791
United States House of Representatives